El Maamora Beach is a popular beach in the neighborhood of El Maamora in Alexandria, Egypt. It is located east of Montaza's royal gardens, and administrated by both the Governorate of Alexandria and the El Maamora Housing and Construction company. It is considered one of the main tourist attractions in Alexandria for its beach and parks.

External links

 Paradise Inn Group Maamoura Beach Resort
 El Maamoura Housing and Construction Company Profile

Neighbourhoods of Alexandria